are lengths of laid rice straw or hemp rope used for ritual purification in the Shinto religion.

 vary in diameter from a few centimetres to several metres, and are often seen festooned with —traditional paper streamers. A space bound by  typically indicates a sacred or ritually pure space, such as that of a Shinto shrine.  are believed to act as a ward against evil spirits, and are often set up at a ground-breaking ceremony before construction begins on a new building. They are often found at Shinto shrines,  gates, and sacred landmarks.

Cutting down these trees is thought to bring misfortune.

Shinto
 originate in Shinto mythology as a hallowed sacrifice related to the Japanese god called , and are used in various Shinto ceremonies. Aboriginal people in Japan have respected and revered  since ancient times.

Origin of 

According to "A popular dictionary of Shinto", Amaterasu hid in a cave called Amano-Iwato after an argument with her brother Susanoo. Therefore, the entire universe lost its luster. Other deities tried numerous ways to attract Amaterasu out of the cave. At the moment that Amaterasu left the cave, the  Futo-tama used a magical rope that drew a line of demarcation between her and the cave, to avoid her returning to the cave.

Shinto shrines

 and nature have been a hallmark of Shinto shrines since in early times. Local people held rituals in shrines. Early shrines were not composed of classical buildings, with rocks, plants and  instead marking their boundaries, as part of the Shinto respect for nature. In Shinto, all the sacred objects and nature were personified. Even a sword from a deceased Japanese warrior could be seen as the god because of its internal spirit and sense of awe. In modern-day society, there are still some sites that use  to demarcate boundaries, such as the Nachi Falls in Kumano.

Types 

 usually appear in a shape similar to a twisted narrow rope with various decorations on it. Zig-zag paper and colorful streamers called  commonly decorate . The size of  differs from simple to complicated.

Decorations 
 are decorated differently depending on the intended blessing and meaning.

: a kind of bitter orange used to decorate . This combination is seen to bring good fortune and prosperity.
 or : folded white paper which stands for lightning, a symbol of fertility.
Pine twigs: using pine twigs to decorate  has a meaning of healthy growth for the next generation, as well as longevity of the elderly.

Biggest  in Japan 

Use

In Mountain Opening Ceremony 

 are used in Japan's Mountain Opening Ceremony, which is held every May 1. There are over 100 Shinto believers who participate in this ceremony. It is a 2-hour journey that they climb from Akakura Mountain Shrine to Fudō Waterfall. When the ceremony is finished, people get together and celebrate.

In New Year's Celebration 
In Japan's New Year celebration, ornaments such as  decorate every household. During this time period, local residents usually hang it on the door in order to drive away evils.

This festival has been held during the New Year period for more than 500 years. It also includes various activities such as 'jostling, climbing fighting with a wooden ball' as well as being sprayed with water. Sometimes these festivals are held in Shinto shrines.

In sumo 

Sumo, Japan's traditional national sport, still involves some elements of Shinto. Moreover, the champion of the sumo has to wear  around his waist in order to attend a victorious ceremony called .

Construction

Material and preparation process 

In Shinto, hemp is regarded as a sacred food with a meaning of purity and fertility. During the process of production, the straw stems are harvested between 70 and 80 days of growth, as beyond this, the quality of the fibre decreases as the plant starts to produce its seeds. After the  straw is collected by machine, it is heated for more than 10 hours, to avoid the stems being dried by the sun. The best stems are then chosen by hand in order to create .

Related objects

People put  in front of  doors. In a procession called ,  are seen as a sacrifice for the gods or a symbol of the existence of the gods. In ancient times, people offered cloth to the Shinto shrines, similarly to today's processions.  are also sometimes used in the way  are.

Like ,  are also a New Year's decoration in Japan, consisting of a  decorated with items related to rice like rice-cakes.

are a reduced version of  used in daily life, and are thought to control rice, salt, and water which could bring people good luck. Therefore, it always appears in the business area such as restaurants as well as conventional industries. Places like the police stations and board ships will also feature .

Raijin

It also be seen as a god's . These trees surrounding the shrine are seen as part of the shrine itself.

are an archway composed of two round posts and two upper cross-beams. The ends of the cross-beams are typically curved, which is a symbol of a style called . There is an under-cross-beam just below the top individually.

 first appeared in Japan at the time Chinese culture and Buddhism were introduced, though their exact origin, including the origin of their shape and name, is unknown; some researchers believe the name  to have originally come from Sanskrit.

With the exception of the cross-beams, people also use  to decorate .

In art 
During the 2017 Yokohama Triennale, Indonesian artist Joko Avianto's artwork, "The border between good and evil is terribly frizzy", was displayed in the center of the hall in the Yokohama Museum of Art. The name, taken from the quote "The border between good and evil is terribly fuzzy" by Czech novelist Milan Kundera, changed 'fuzzy' to 'frizzy' because of the twisted, -inspired shape of his artwork.

production in Taiwan

Taiwan's Miaoli County began to produce  for export to Japan in 1998. In the late 1990s, Japanese manufacturers visited Taiwan and found the high quality of straw as well as the relatively low cost of producing it. However, as there were no local residents who knew how to make , the Japanese started to provide free classes for them to study the skills for producing . The  industry in Taiwan developed rapidly, with many large  factories appeared in Taiwan in the late 1990s. However, due to industrial disruption, most factories were forced to shut down a few years later, and only one factory was left to continue production. Other remaining factories chose to hand over the work to other Southeast Asian countries, particularly Vietnam, for a lower cost production. Later in 2005, a large number of  orders were transferred back to Taiwan because buyers in Japan found that the quality of  produced in Vietnam was poorer compared to those produced in Taiwan.

The craftsmen in Taiwan harvest the straw to make , while Japanese manufacturers provide samples or finished products to the customers according to their orders.

Image gallery

See also
 , household Shinto shrines
  – a custom utilizing 
 , traditional Japanese braided cord

References

Further reading
 Kasulis, Thomas P. (2004). Shinto: The Way Home. University of Hawaii Press. .

External links

"Shimenawa" in Encyclopedia of Shinto

Decorative ropework
Shinto in Japan
Shinto religious objects
Straw objects